The 1997 Korean Professional Football League was the 15th season of K League. Busan Daewoo Royals won three domestic trophies including two Korean League Cups in this season.

League table

Awards

Main awards

Best XI

Source:

See also
 1997 Korean League Cup
 1997 Korean League Cup (Supplementary Cup)
 1997 Korean FA Cup

References

External links
 RSSSF

K League seasons
1
South Korea
South Korea